Jacqueline Anne Wainwright (born 28 May 1947) is an English former cricketer who played as a right-handed batter and right-arm off break bowler. She appeared in 2 Test matches and 2 One Day Internationals for England in 1979. She played domestic cricket for East Anglia.

References

External links
 

1947 births
Living people
Sportspeople from Hemel Hempstead
England women Test cricketers
England women One Day International cricketers
East Anglia women cricketers